Park Lane Mall, originally Park Lane Centre, was a shopping center in Reno, Nevada, at South Virginia Street and Plumb Lane. As it grew, became the leading area mall. Original architects were Victor Gruen Associates and Charles Luckman Associates. At the main opening ceremonies on March 9, 1967, it had 23 stores, with anchors:
Full-line department stores:Reno Evening Gazette, March 8, 1967, pp. 6, 8, 45 ff.
 Sears, opened in 1965 before the rest of the mall,  – 3 times the size of its store in Downtown Reno
 Weinstock's department store that (not part of the 23 stores open in March 1967; it opened in Summer 1967) – three floors, air-conditioned, decorated in Portuguese marble at ground level
Specialty department stores:
Roos/Atkins, a San Francisco-based clothing retailer with roots in Virginia City, Nevada (closed 1981)
Joseph Magnin, (opened early in November 1966)

The rest of the specialty stores or "main mall", was completed in 1967. 

By the mid-1990s, Sears, Weinstocks, and Joseph Magnin had closed, and its competitor Meadowood Mall, more than double its size, had taken over as the city's most popular mall. ParkLane added Gottschalks department store and a new movie theater, but continued in decline until closing in January 2007. The mall stood empty until Reno Land bought it after the Great Recession.
 

References

Shopping malls in Nevada

1967 establishments in Nevada
Buildings and structures in Reno, Nevada
Demolished buildings and structures in Nevada
Demolished shopping malls in the United States
Victor Gruen buildings
Charles Luckman buildings